The following highways are numbered 697:

United States